Saint-Germain-Beaupré is a commune in the Creuse department in central France.

Population

See also
Château de Saint-Germain-Beaupré
Communes of the Creuse department

References

Communes of Creuse